Elachista serra is a moth of the family Elachistidae. It is found in Canada, where it has been recorded from Labrador.

References

serra
Moths described in 1996
Moths of North America